The Lady with a Lamp is a 1951 British historical film directed by Herbert Wilcox and starring Anna Neagle, Michael Wilding and Felix Aylmer. The film depicts the life of Florence Nightingale and her work with wounded British soldiers during the Crimean War.

Plot
Illustrating the political complexities the hard-headed nurse had to battle in order to achieve sanitary medical conditions during the Crimean War. Opposed in the uppermost circles of British government because she is "merely" a woman, Florence Nightingale is championed by the Hon. Sidney Herbert (Michael Wilding), minister of war. Herbert pulls strings to allow Nightingale and her nursing staff access to battlefield hospitals, and in so doing changes the course of medical history.

Partial cast
 Anna Neagle as Florence Nightingale 
 Michael Wilding as Lord Herbert
 Felix Aylmer as Lord Palmerston 
 Gladys Young as Mrs Bracebridge 
 Julian D'Albie as Mr Bracebridge 
 Arthur Young as William Gladstone 
 Edwin Styles as Mr Nightingale 
 Helen Shingler as Parthenope Nightingale 
 Rosalie Crutchley as Mrs Sidney Herbert
 Clement McCallin as Richard M. Milnes
 Helena Pickard as Queen Victoria
 Peter Graves as Prince Albert
 Sybil Thorndike as Miss Bosanquet
 Monckton Hoffe as Lord Stratford
 Cecil Trouncer as Sir Douglass Dawson

Box office
The film was popular at the British box office.

Critical reception
TV Guide gave the film three out of four stars, and noted, "the contrast in settings--between stately British homes and the squalor of the hospital--focuses the viewer's attentions on what the real battles were. Honorable mention should be given to Lewthwaite's editing of the war sequences."; while Leonard Maltin also gave the film three out of four stars, noting a "Methodical recreation of 19th- century nurse-crusader Florence Nightingale, tastefully enacted by Neagle."; while Variety observed, "Anna Neagle adds another portrait to her screen gallery of famous women. Her characterization of Florence Nightingale is a sincerely moving study...Michael Wilding is not too happily cast as Sidney Herbert, War Minister. Within limitations, he makes the best of this part. The strong feature cast includes Felix Aylmer, with an exceptionally good study of Lord Palmerston. Herbert Wilcox, as always, directs in a plain, straightforward manner."

References

External links

1951 films
British war films
Crimean War films
Films about Florence Nightingale
Films directed by Herbert Wilcox
1950s historical films
British historical films
Films set in the 1850s
Films set in London
Cultural depictions of Florence Nightingale
Cultural depictions of Queen Victoria
British black-and-white films
1950s English-language films
1950s British films